Monash is a town in the Riverland area of South Australia. It is on the Sturt Highway between Barmera and Renmark. At the 2006 census, Monash had a population of 1,115.

Monash was proclaimed in 1921 and is named after General Sir John Monash, a World War I army commander. The primary industry is irrigated horticulture and viticulture.

Monash is in the Berri Barmera Council, state electoral district of Chaffey, and federal Division of Barker. Its postcode is 5342.

Settlement
Land at Monash was allocated to repatriated soldiers returned from World War I as part of the State Government Soldier Settler Scheme. The southern part of the settlement was occupied first and was originally known as Lone Gum after a prominent local landmark, a River Red Gum tree (Eucalyptus camaldulensis). The tree still stands today, although it was nearly destroyed in a fire caused by a local land owner. The tree's image is used on the Monash Primary School emblem.

Monash Adventure Playground
Monash is best known in South Australia as the home of a major adventure playground for adults as well as children with tall, fast and twisty slippery dips and other equipment. This was built by a local engineering company, and open for free public use. Concerns about public liability led to its scaling down and eventual closure. It reopened in 1996 without the high towers, but with better picnic facilities and less "dangerous" equipment now including a giant maze. In the mid-2000s the flying fox connected to the high towers were removed because citizens viewed them as a safety hazard.

See also
List of parks and gardens in rural South Australia

Notes and references

Towns in South Australia
Australian soldier settlements
Riverland
1921 establishments in Australia